Tapirus lundeliusi is an extinct species of tapir that lived in Florida in the early Pleistocene. It was similar in size and shape to the still-living mountain tapir (T. pinchaque), with an estimated weight of 203 kg

Taxonomy 
There are multiple pieces of evidence which indicate most, if not all, of the 5 accepted Pleistocene tapir species found in the modern-day United States (T. californicus, T. haysii (T. copei), T. lundeliusi, T. merriami, T. veroensis) may actually belong to the same species. T. californicus was considered to be a subspecies of T. haysii by Merriam, T. californicus and T. veroensis are nearly impossible to distinguish morphologically and occupy the same time frame, being separated only by location, and T. haysii, T. veroensis, and T. lundeliusi are already considered so closely related that they occupy the same subgenus (Helicotapirus). Additionally, few details distinguish T. haysii and T. veroensis except size, date, and wear of teeth; and the intermediate sizes overlap greatly with many specimens originally assigned to one species, then later switched over to another.

References 

Prehistoric tapirs
Prehistoric mammals of North America